"Big Thing" is a song recorded by Lisa Stansfield's band, Blue Zone. It was written by Stansfield, Ian Devaney and Andy Morris, and produced by Blue Zone. At first, "Big Thing" was released on the B-side of "Thinking About His Baby" on 25 January 1988.

"Big Thing" was picked up by DJs on Kiss-FM and Tony Blackburn on his BBC Radio London show.  Thanks to that the single sold 10,000 copies in a week. Because of this success, "Big Thing" was released on the A-side, and "Thinking About His Baby" on its B-side. For this release, "Big Thing" was also remixed by Blue Zone (Big Dub Club Mix).

Although Blue Zone's 1988 album was titled Big Thing, it did not feature "Big Thing." The song was later included on "This Is the Right Time" single (1989), The Complete Collection box set (2003), and "Easier/Treat Me Like a Woman" single (2004). Stansfield performed it during her 2013 Seven Tour.

Track listings
UK 12" single
"Big Thing" (Extended) – 6:40
"Big Thing" (Big Dub Club Mix) – 7:30
"Thinking About His Baby" – 4:01

Other remixes
"Big Thing" – 4:57
"Big Thing" (Extended Edit) – 5:40
"Big Thing" (Redux) – 5:25

References

1988 songs
1988 singles
Blue Zone (band) songs
Songs written by Lisa Stansfield
Arista Records singles
Songs written by Ian Devaney
Songs written by Andy Morris (musician)